Explorer S-56 was a NASA satellite launched on 4 December 1960, at 21:14 GMT as part of the Explorer program. The satellite was composed of a  diameter inflatable sphere, and was intended to study the density of the upper atmosphere. The Scout X-1 rocket used to launch Explorer S-56 failed in flight, and the satellite never reached orbit.

Spacecraft design 
The spacecraft consisted of alternating layers of aluminium foil and Mylar polyester film. Uniformly distributed over the aluminium surface were -diameter dots of white paint for thermal control.

Upon separation of the fourth stage, the sphere will be inflated by a nitrogen gas bottle, and a separation spring will eject it out into its own orbit. The two hemispheres of aluminium foil will be separated with a gap of Mylar at the spacecraft's equator and will serve as the antenna. A 136 MHz, 15 mW beacon will be carried for tracking purposes, the beacon and the SAO Baker-Nunn camera network will be relied upon for tracking. Power will be supplied by solar cells and rechargeable batteries.

Launch 
Explorer S-56 was launched, at 21:14 GMT on 4 December 1960, from Launch Area 3 at the Wallops Flight Facility (WFF), atop a Scout X-1 launch vehicle with the serial number ST-3. It was the first attempt to place a satellite in orbit using an all-solid propellant launch vehicle and the first orbital attempt made from NASA's Wallops Island facility. It was replaced by the identical Explorer 9 (1961-004A) spacecraft.

The first of six identical air density research satellites to be launched.

See also 

 Explorer 9
 Explorer program

References 

Satellites of the United States
Explorers Program